Holaspina is a genus of mites in the family Parholaspididae. There is at least one described species in Holaspina, H. alstoni.

References

Parholaspididae
Articles created by Qbugbot